Khabary is a rural locality (a station) in Korotoyaksky Selsoviet, Khabarsky District, Altai Krai, Russia. The population was 89 as of 2013. There is 1 street.

References 

Rural localities in Khabarsky District